The 1932 Brooklyn Dodgers season was their third in the league. The team improved on their previous season's output of 2–12, winning three games. They failed to qualify for the playoffs.

Schedule

Standings

References

Brooklyn Dodgers (NFL) seasons
Brooklyn Dodgers (NFL)
Brooklyn
1930s in Brooklyn
Flatbush, Brooklyn